Model D may refer to:

 AJS Model D, a motorcycle
 Cadillac Model D, a car
 Curtiss Model D, an early pusher aircraft
 Gee Bee Model D, a sports aircraft
 Leading Edge Model D, a personal computer
 MAB Model D pistol
Minimoog Model D, a synthesizer
 Wright Model D, an observation aircraft

See also
 Class D (disambiguation)
 Type D (disambiguation)